An upazila, formerly called thana, is an administrative division in Bangladesh, functioning as a sub-unit of a district. It can be seen as an analogous to a county or a borough of Western countries. Rural upazilas are further administratively divided into union council areas (union parishads).

Bangladesh has 495 upazilas. The upazilas are the second lowest tier of regional administration in Bangladesh. The administrative structure consists of divisions (8), districts (64), upazilas (495) and union parishads (UPs). This system of devolution was introduced by the former military ruler and president of Bangladesh, Lt-Gen Hossain Muhammad Ershad, in an attempt to strengthen local government.

Below UPs, villages (gram) and para exist, but these have no administrative power and elected members. The Local Government Ordinance of 1982 was amended a year later, redesignating and upgrading the existing thanas as upazilas.

History 

Upazilas were formerly known as thana, which literally means police station. Despite the meaning, thanas functioned much as an administrative and geographic region, much as today's upazilas. In 1982 thanas were re-termed to as upazilas with provisions for semi-autonomous local governance. This system was reverted to the thana system in 1992. Later in 1999 geographic regions under administrations of thanas were converted into upazilas. All administrative terms in this level were renamed from thana to upazila. For instance, thana nirbahi officer (lit. thana executive officer) was renamed upazila nirbahi officer (lit. upazila executive officer).

The word thana is now used to solely refer to police stations. Generally, there is one police station for each upazila, but larger administrative units may have more than one police station covering different regions.

On 26 July 2021, Khandker Anwarul Islam announced the renaming of Dakshin Sunamganj Upazila to "Shantiganj Upazila" as well as the creation of three new upazilas; Eidgaon Upazila in Cox’s Bazar District, Modhyanagar Upazila in Sunamganj District and Dasar Upazila in Madaripur District.

Administration

Upazila nirbahi officer 

Upazila nirbahi officer (UNO, or upazila executive officer) is a non-elected administrator in an upazila. UNOs are senior assistant secretary of Bangladesh Civil Service (Administration) Cadre. They act as executive officer of the upazila under the elected posts.

Upazila parishad 
Each upazila parishad (or council) has a chairman, a vice-chairman and a woman vice-chairman. All three are elected through direct popular election. Union parishad chairmen within the upazila are considered as the members of the porishod. The post of a woman vice-chairman was created to ensure at least one-third woman representation in the all elected posts of the local government.

On 22 January 2010 the first election in 18 years of upazila porishod was held.

Lists of upazilas

See also 

 Divisions of Bangladesh
 Districts of Bangladesh
 Villages of Bangladesh
 Unions of Bangladesh

References

External links 
 Statoids
 Maps of Divisions, Districts & Upazilas of Bangladesh

 
Subdivisions of Bangladesh
Bangladesh geography-related lists
Lists of subdivisions of Bangladesh
Bangladesh 3